Seredka or Seryodka is the name of several rural localities in Russia:
Seredka, Lodeynopolsky District, Leningrad Oblast, a village in Alekhovshchinskoye Settlement Municipal Formation of Lodeynopolsky District of Leningrad Oblast
Seredka, Tikhvinsky District, Leningrad Oblast, a village in Koskovskoye Settlement Municipal Formation of Tikhvinsky District of Leningrad Oblast
Seredka, Novgorod Oblast, a village under the administrative jurisdiction of the urban-type settlement of Nebolchi, Lyubytinsky District, Novgorod Oblast
Seryodka, Pskovsky District, Pskov Oblast, a selo in Pskovsky District, Pskov Oblast
Seredka, Strugo-Krasnensky District, Pskov Oblast, a village in Strugo-Krasnensky District, Pskov Oblast
Seredka, Tver Oblast, a village in Penovsky District of Tver Oblast
Seredka, Vologda Oblast, a village in Megrinsky Selsoviet of Chagodoshchensky District of Vologda Oblast
Seredka, Breytovsky District, Yaroslavl Oblast, a village in Filimonovsky Rural Okrug of Breytovsky District of Yaroslavl Oblast
Seredka, Latskovsky Rural Okrug, Nekouzsky District, Yaroslavl Oblast, a village in Latskovsky Rural Okrug of Nekouzsky District of Yaroslavl Oblast
Seredka, Rozhalovsky Rural Okrug, Nekouzsky District, Yaroslavl Oblast, a village in Rozhalovsky Rural Okrug of Nekouzsky District of Yaroslavl Oblast